Granite Store, or variants thereof, may refer to:

in the United States
 Granite Store (Sullivan, Maine), listed on the National Register of Historic Places in Hancock County, Maine]]
 Granite Store (Uxbridge, Massachusetts), listed on the National Register of Historic Places

See also
Granite Building (disambiguation)